Feng Renliang (born 12 May 1988) is a Chinese footballer who currently plays for China League One side Beijing Renhe.

Club career
Feng Renliang started his football career playing for third-tier side Tianjin Huochetou in 2008 where he was considered a highly talented youngster. He was scouted by several Chinese clubs before joining top-tier side Shanghai Shenhua at the beginning of the 2010 league season with teammate Song Boxuan. Feng was immediately selected as the team's first-choice right winger by then manager Miroslav Blažević and he would make his debut on 23 March 2010 in a league game against Changsha Ginde in a 2-0 loss. Despite this loss, he kept his place within the team and would show his attacking abilities a few weeks later on 10 April 2010 when he scored his first goal for the club in a 2-1 win against Hangzhou Greentown.

On 20 November 2012, Chinese Super League side Guangzhou Evergrande officially announced they had signed Feng for an undisclosed fee. He made his debut for the club on 8 March 2013 in a 5-1 win against Shanghai Shenxin. He scored his first goal for the club in a 3-0 win against Henan Jianye on 8 March 2014.
On 16 June 2014, Feng joined Changchun Yatai on loan for the rest of the 2014 season. He made his debut for the club on 20 July 2014 in a 3-2 loss against Hangzhou Greentown. On 28 February 2015, Feng was loaned out to Guizhou Renhe for the 2015 season. He made his debut for the club on 7 March 2015 in a 1-0 loss against Liaoning Whowin.

In November 2015, Feng transferred to China League One side Beijing Renhe.

International career
Feng was called up to the Chinese national team and make his debut in a 1-1 draw against Bahrain on 11 August 2010. After several further friendlies, Feng was called up to the preliminary squad for the 2011 AFC Asian Cup and while he wasn't guaranteed a spot within the team he was expected to play for the Chinese under-23 national team in their qualification campaign for the 2012 Summer Olympics, however it was discovered during this period that Feng had lied about his age and instead of being born 8 January 1989 he was actually born 12 May 1988. On 24 December 2010, the Chinese Football Association would fine Tianjin Locomotive and Shanghai Shenhua for their knowledge of this and banned Feng for three games, which essentially meant he would be dropped for the 2011 AFC Asian Cup. Feng scored his first goal for the national team on 8 June 2012 in a 3-0 win against Vietnam.

Career statistics

Club statistics 
.

International goals
Results list China's goal tally first.

Honours

Club
Guangzhou Evergrande
Chinese Super League: 2013
AFC Champions League: 2013

References

External links

 
Player stats at sohu.com
Player profile at Shanghai Shenhua website

1988 births
Living people
Chinese footballers
Footballers from Tianjin
China international footballers
Shanghai Shenhua F.C. players
Guangzhou F.C. players
Changchun Yatai F.C. players
Beijing Renhe F.C. players
Chinese Super League players
China League One players
Association football wingers